South Asian Football Federation (SAFF), founded in 1997, is an association of the football playing nations in South Asia which is the regional subsidiary of the larger Asian Football Confederation. The members of the association are Bangladesh, Bhutan, India, Maldives, Nepal, Pakistan and Sri Lanka.

History 
The SAFF was founded in 1997, with Bangladesh, India, the Maldives, Nepal, Pakistan, and Sri Lanka. In 2000, they expanded to 7 members, adding Bhutan. In 2005, Afghanistan joined too, but later, left in 2015, to join then newly formed Central Asian Football Association.

Presidents 

 *Due to health issues in 2016,  Ranjith Rodrigo replaced Salahuddin as acting president for two months.

Member associations

Former member

Competitions

The South Asian Football Federation runs several competitions on subcontinental level.

National team

Men's
SAFF Championship
South Asian Games Men's football tournament
SAFF U-20 Championship
SAFF U-17 Championship

Women's
SAFF Women's Championship
South Asian Games Women's football tournament
SAFF U-18 Women's Championship
SAFF U-15 Women's Championship

Club
The South Asian Football Federation announced in April 2011 that they had decided to start a new tournament for association football club sides, the SAFF Club Championship, with the inaugural edition to be held in Bangladesh from 1–15 September of the same year. However the competition was postponed and desires to revive the competition were again announced in July 2013 but the competition has still not started with accusations that India, the prime nation in the competition, are not altogether interested in participating.

Sri Lanka was supposed to host first edition in August 2014. That however did not happen.

A new possible start was set for December 2016 but later announced that 2017 would see the first edition. This again was changed and announced that 2018 would be the start of the tournament. But the Club Championship was never a reality and only remained as a plan on paper.

Current title holders

Titles by nation 

Note: (†) Member from 2005 till 2015

SAFF teams at continental and global tournaments
Legend

 – Champion
 – Runner-up
 – Third place
 – Fourth place
QF – Quarterfinals
R16 – Round of 16 
GS – Group stage 
1S – First knockout stage
 — Did not qualify
 — Qualified but withdrew
 — Did not enter / withdrawn / banned / disqualified

 — Hosts

For each tournament, the flag of the host country and the number of teams in each finals tournament (in brackets) are shown.

Senior

Men's

FIFA World Cup

AFC Asian Cup

AFC Challenge Cup

AFC Solidarity Cup

Women's

AFC Women's Asian Cup

Junior

Men's U-20

AFC U-20 Asian Cup

Men's U-17

FIFA U-17 World Cup

AFC U-17 Asian Cup

Women's U-20

AFC U-20 Women's Asian Cup

Women's U-17

FIFA U-17 Women's World Cup

AFC U-17 Women's Asian Cup

Rankings 

Rankings are calculated by FIFA.

Men's National Teams 

 Last updated: 22 December 2022

Leading Men's Team:

Women's National Teams 

 Last updated: 9 December 2022

Leading Women's team:

Individual statistics

Top goalscorer in men's football 
, the players with most goals scored in career from South Asia (SAFF) are:

By number of goals

By country 

 Players in bold are active international players.

Top goalscorer in women's football 
, the players with most goals scored in career from South Asia (SAFF) are:

By number of goals

By country 

 Players in bold are active international players.

References

External links
 South Asian Football Federation Cup at RSSSF
 South Asia Football – SAFF website (archived)

South Asian Football Federation